A novel is a long prose narrative.

Novel, or novels, or The Novels, may also refer to:

Places
 Novel, Haute-Savoie, a commune in eastern France

People
 Novel (musician) (born 1981), American hip-hop artist
 Novel Baswedan (born 1977), Indonesian investigator

Medicine
 Novel virus, a virus that has not previously been recorded
 Novel coronavirus, a provisional name given to recently discovered coronaviruses of medical significance

Arts, entertainment, and media

Music
 Novel (album), an album by Joey Pearson
 "Novel", a minor musical side project of Adam Young's

Other uses in arts, entertainment, and media
 Novel (film), a 2008 Malayalam film
 Novel: A Forum on Fiction, an academic journal
 The Novel, a 1991 novel by James A. Michener

Laws
 Novellae Constitutiones or The Novels, laws passed by Byzantine Emperor Justinian I
  Novels (Roman law), a term for a new Roman law in the Byzantine era

Other uses
 Novel, Inc., a video game studio and enterprise simulation developer

See also
 Novell
 Novella (disambiguation)
 Novelty